The Miss Louisiana Teen USA competition is the pageant that selects the representative for the state of Louisiana in the Miss Teen USA pageant.

Louisiana is in the top 10 most successful states at Miss Teen USA in terms of number and value of placements. Notable former Miss Louisiana Teen USA titleholders are Miss USA 1996 Ali Landry, Miss Teen USA 2004 Shelley Hennig, Miss Teen USA 2015 Katherine Haik, and Jennifer Dupont, who placed first runner-up at Miss America 2005.  Landry and Hennig have gone on to successful acting careers.  Candice Stewart, Miss Louisiana Teen USA 2002 was a contestant on CBS's Big Brother 15 in 2013.  

At 15, Haik is the youngest woman to win the Miss Teen USA title.

Miss Louisiana Teen USA is produced by RPM Productions since 1990, which also produces the Miss USA and Miss Teen USA state pageants for Alabama, North Carolina and South Carolina. 

Ainsley Ross of Bossier City was crowned Miss Louisiana Teen USA 2022 on February 20, 2022 at Lafon Performing Arts Center in Luling. She will represent Louisiana for the title of Miss Teen USA 2022.

Gallery of titleholders

Results summary

Placements
Miss Teen USAs: Shelley Hennig (2004), Katherine Haik (2015) 
1st runners-up: Sarah Thornhill (1999) 
2nd runners-up: Bobbie Brown (1987), Amy Pietsch (1988)
3rd runners-up: Lindsey Evans (2008)
4th runners-up: Brittany Guidry (2009), Sydney Taylor (2020)
Top 6: Allison McIntyre (1991)
Top 10: Shasta St. Angelo (1986), Nina Moch (2000), Paige Egan (2001), Lindsey Conque (2018)
Top 12: Ali Landry (1990), Sarah Lowther (1994)
Top 15/16: Bailey Hidalgo (2013), Ellie Picone (2016), Gracie Petry (2021)
Louisiana holds a record of 18 placements at Miss Teen USA.

Awards
Miss Congeniality: Robin Swain (1984)

Winners 

1 Age at the time of the Miss Teen USA pageant

References

External links
Official website

Louisiana
Women in Louisiana
1983 establishments in Louisiana